NGC 2074 is a magnitude ~8 emission nebula in the Tarantula Nebula located in the constellation Dorado. It was discovered on 3 August 1826 by James Dunlop
and around 1835 by John Herschel. It is described as being "pretty bright, pretty large, much extended, [and having] 5 stars involved".

Discovery 
Some of the objects catalogued by Herschel before 1847 do not have a discovery date listed, and NGC 2074 is one of them. Though its inclusion in the catalog of objects observed in the Large Magellanic Cloud which involves observations carried out between 2 November 1836 and 26 March 1837 shows it must not have been discovered later than that.

The observation of NGC 2074 by Dunlop was not identified as this object until recently.

Location 
The area has a lot of raw stellar creation, possibly triggered by a nearby supernova explosion and is on the edge of a dark molecular cloud which is an incubator for the birth of new stars.

References

External links 
 
 NGC 2074 on WikiSky
 Picture of the Day: Week 34, 2008

Emission nebulae
2074
Discoveries by James Dunlop
Astronomical objects discovered in 1826
Dorado (constellation)